Subbamma is an Indian name of feminine nature.
 B. V. Subbamma was an indigenous scholar, Indian theologian.
 Santha Kumari, birth name Vellaala Subbamma, is an Indian musical artist and film actress.
 Subbamma is a local deity of Punganuru, Andhra Pradesh